Emile Hirsch (1832–1904) was a French stained glass artist.

References

1832 births
1904 deaths
École des Beaux-Arts alumni
French stained glass artists and manufacturers
Artists from Metz